Miloš Stanojević may refer to:

 Miloš Stanojević (rower) (born 1984), Serbian rower
 Miloš Stanojević (footballer) (born 1993), Serbian footballer